Grand Saint-Antoine is a local service district within Kent County that surrounds the Village of Saint-Antoine in the Canadian province New Brunswick. Straddling the boundaries of three parishes – Dundas, Saint Mary, and Wellington – the local service district is divided into three designated places by Statistics Canada.

Demographics 

See also 
List of communities in New Brunswick
List of local service districts in New Brunswick

References 

Communities in Kent County, New Brunswick
Designated places in New Brunswick
Local service districts of Kent County, New Brunswick